Fermina Márquez is a short novel in twenty chapters written by French writer Valery Larbaud. It was considered for the Prix Goncourt in 1911 but did not win. Nonetheless, it is still considered to be a minor classic of French literature and one of Larbaud's best known works along with his Diary of A.O. Barnabooth.

The story concerns the arrival of a young girl from Colombia at Saint Augustine's, a Roman Catholic school for boys located near Paris, and her effect on the young men there, particularly on a bookish and solitary student, Joanny Léniot. The eponymous Fermina Márquez arrives at the school with her aunt, sister and younger brother, "little Márquez", who was just enrolled there as a student. His family makes an arrangement with the school authorities in which they are allowed to visit him at Saint Augustine's for a time until he becomes adjusted to life at his new school. The students are entranced by Fermina's beauty and proximity, and each begins to fantasise about her and to look for opportunities to seduce her.

1911 French novels
Novels set in Paris
Novels set in schools